Captain of the Guard is a 1930 American musical film directed by John S. Robertson and Pál Fejös and starring Laura La Plante, John Boles and Sam De Grasse. It is set during the French Revolution, but was sufficiently unhistorical that an apology was included in the opening credit for any factual inaccuracies.

Cast
 Laura La Plante as Marie Marnay  
 John Boles as Rouget de Lisle  
 Sam De Grasse as Bazin  
 James A. Marcus as Marnay  
 Lionel Belmore as Colonel of Hussars  
 Stuart Holmes as Louis XVI
 Evelyn Hall as Marie Antoinette  
 Claude Fleming as Magistrate  
 Murdock MacQuarrie as Pierre  
 Richard Cramer as Danton
 Harry Burkhardt as Materown  
 George Hackathorne as Robespierre
 DeWitt Jennings as priest  
 Harry Cording as Le Bruin  
 Otis Harlan as Jacques  
 Ervin Renard as Lieutenant 
 Walter Brennan as peasant (uncredited) 
 Sidney D'Albrook as flirtatious officer (uncredited)  
 Louise Emmons as Peasant (uncredited)  
 Stanley Fields as Hangman (uncredited)  
 Francis Ford as Hussars Officer (uncredited) 
 Charles Thurston as Minor Role (uncredited)

Production
Initial director Pál Fejös escaped serious injury during filming in October 1929 after falling 88 feet from scaffolding while directing a mob scene, and was later replaced by John S. Robertson. Robertson received full directing credit for the film.

References

External links

1930 films
1930s historical musical films
Films directed by John S. Robertson
Films directed by Paul Fejos
Films set in France
Films set in the 18th century
Universal Pictures films
American black-and-white films
French Revolution films
Cultural depictions of Maximilien Robespierre
Cultural depictions of Louis XVI
Cultural depictions of Marie Antoinette
Cultural depictions of Georges Danton
American historical musical films
1930s English-language films
1930s American films